Pavla Vykopalová (born 23 March 1972 in Prague) is a Czech soprano.

Life
Vykopalová studied singing at the Prague Conservatory and graduated in 1993; she then became a member of the Prague Philharmonic Choir. She began her soloist career as a mezzo-soprano receiving singing lessons from Lenka Šmídová und since 1997 from Jiří Kotouč. In 2006, she made the transition from mezzo to soprano and has been continuing her voice training with Marie Urbanová. Vykopalová's repertoire includes roles from Baroque period until the 20th century; beside opera roles she devotes herself to oratorios, cantatas and songs, including contemporary works.

During her studies at the conservatory, Vykopalová performed with the "Opera Mozart" company in Prague; in 1988 she was engaged at the opera of the Plzeň (Pilsen) Theatre. Since January 2009, she is member of the opera ensemble at the National Theatre Brno; she appeared at the same time already since 1999 as a permanent guest artist at the National Theatre in Prague and the Prague State Opera. In 2003, she sang the role of Karolka in Janáček's Jenůfa in a production at the Théâtre du Châtelet in Paris. In 2011/12, she performed the same role in a co-production of three French opera houses – Rennes, Limoges and Reims.

For the role of Mařenka in Smetana's The Bartered Bride, directed by Ondřej Havelka at the National Theatre in Brno, Vykopalová received a nomination for the Czech Thalia Price in 2006. In 2013, she received another nomination for the Thalia Price 2012 for the role of Míla in Janáček's Destiny at the National Theatre in Brno.

Soprano roles
National Theatre Prague
Jenůfa (Janáček: Jenůfa)
Antonia (Offenbach: The Tales of Hoffmann)
Paskalina (Martinů: The Miracles of Mary)
Mařenka (Smetana: The Bartered Bride)
Fiordiligi (Mozart: Così fan tutte)
Countess (Mozart: Le nozze di Figaro)
Vitellia (Mozart: La clemenza di Tito)
Donna Elvira, Zerlina (both Mozart: Don Giovanni)
Pamina (Mozart: The Magic Flute)

State Opera Prague
Desdemona (Verdi: Otello)
Rusalka (Dvořák: Rusalka)
Mimì (Puccini: La bohème)
Pamina (Mozart: The Magic Flute)
Rosina (Rossini: Il barbiere di Siviglia)

National Theatre Brno
Míla (Janáček: Destiny)
Donna Elvira (Mozart: Don Giovanni)
Micaëla (Bizet: Carmen)
Countess (Mozart: Le nozze di Figaro)
Liu (Puccini: Turandot)
Jenůfa (Janáček: Jenůfa)
Countess (Mozart: Le nozze di Figaro)
Rosalinda (J. Strauss II: Die Fledermaus)
Lauretta (Puccini: Gianni Schicchi)
Nedda (Leoncavallo: Pagliacci)
Mařenka (Smetana: The Bartered Bride)
Julietta (Martinů: Julietta)
Rosina (Rossini: Il barbiere di Siviglia)

Other opera productions
Clarice (G. Scarlatti: Dove è amore è gelosia – concert performance; 2009)

Oratorio and cantata repertoire
 A. Scarlatti: Stabat Mater
 Zelenka: Missa Dei Filii
 F. X. Brixi: Missa pastoralis
 Wanhal: Stabat Mater
 Mozart: Great Mass in C minor
 Mozart: Exsultate, jubilate, K. 165
 Mozart: Requiem
 Dvořák: Stabat Mater
 Dvořák: The Wedding Shirts (Svatební košile, The Spectre's Bride)
 Dvořák: Saint Ludmila
 Dvořák: Mass in D major
 Dvořák: Requiem
 Dvořák: Te Deum
 Fauré: Requiem
 Bernstein: Symphony No. 3 – Kaddish

Song cycles
 Dvořák: Love Songs, Op. 83
 Wiedermann: Spiritual Chants
 Martinů: The New Špalíček, H 288
 Ravel: Shéhérazade
 Shostakovich: From Jewish Folk Poetry, Op. 79
 Pololáník: The Easter Journey

Former mezzo-soprano roles
Dido (Purcell: Dido and Aeneas – Pilsen Theatre)
Ruggiero (Händel: Alcina – Concert performance)
Bertarido (Händel: Rodelinda – Concert performance)
Rinaldo (Händel: Rinaldo – Concert performance)
Elisa (G. B. Bononcini: Astarto – Concert performance)
Vénus (Saint-Saëns: Hélène – Concert performance)
Alcina (Vivaldi: Orlando furioso – State Opera Prague)
Prince Orlofsky (J. Strauss II: Die Fledermaus – State Opera Prague)
Fenena (Verdi: Nabucco – State Opera Prague)
Mercedes (Bizet: Carmen – State Opera Prague)
Béatrice (Berlioz: Béatrice et Bénédict – State Opera Prag)
Second Lady (Mozart: The Magic Flute – State Opera Prague; National Theatre Prague)
Second Wood Sprite (Dvořák: Rusalka – State Opera Prague; National Theatre Prague)
Dorabella (Mozart: Così fan tutte – Opera Mozart; State Opera Prague; National Theatre Prague)
Hirte (Puccini: Tosca – National Theatre Prague)
Záviš (Smetana: The Devil's Wall – National Theatre Prague)
Cherubino (Mozart: Le nozze di Figaro – National Theatre Prague)
Minerva (Rameau: Castor et Pollux – National Theatre Prague)
Karolka (Janáček: Jenůfa – National Theatre Prague; Théâtre du Châtelet, Paris)

Recordings
1998 Jakub Jan Ryba: Czech Christmas Mass''' (Zdena Kloubová, Pavla Vykopalová, Tomáš Černý, Roman Janál; Czech Radio Chamber Choir; Kühn Children Choir; Virtuosi di Praga)
2003 Antonín Rejcha – Lenore (Dramatic Cantata after G.&.B.Bürger (1805/1806), Camilla Nylund (Lenore), Pavla Vykopalová (Mother), Corby Welch (Narrator), Vladimir Chmelo (Wilhelm), Prague Chamber Choir
2005 Bedřich Antonín Wiedermann (Irena Chřibková – organ, Pavla Vykopalová – mezzo-soprano); the CD contains unique and until that time not recorded works of a composer and organist (1883–1951) who worked at the St. Jacob‘s Basilika in Prague.

References

External links
Official Homepage of Pavla Vykopalová
Profile of Pavla Vykopalová – National Theatre Brno
Profile of Pavla Vykopalová – National Theatre Prague
Profile of Pavla Vykopalová – State Opera Prague
Interview for Opera News'', May 2007
Interview for the OperaPLUS portal, February 2010 

1972 births
Living people
Musicians from Prague
Czech operatic sopranos
20th-century Czech women opera singers
21st-century Czech women opera singers
Recipients of the Thalia Award